The Last Lullaby is 2008 drama/noir film starring Tom Sizemore, and Sasha Alexander. Filming took place in Shreveport, Louisiana.

The film won the Best Actress (Sasha Alexander) and Audience Award at the San Diego Film Festival in 2008.

Plot 
Price (Tom Sizemore) is an ex-hitman who retired to live the "easy life" only to find himself restless. He takes one final contract on Sarah (Sasha Alexander), a small town library employee, only to fall in love with his target.

Cast 
 Tom Sizemore as Price
 Sasha Alexander as Sarah
 Bill Smitrovich as Martin
 Sprague Grayden as Jules
 Ray McKinnon as Ominous Figure
 Randall Batinkoff as Rick
 Jerry Hardin as Martin Lennox
 Smith Cho as Connie

References

External links 
 Official Site
 

2008 drama films
2008 films
American drama films
2000s English-language films
2000s American films